The list of shipwrecks in 1985 includes ships sunk, foundered, grounded, or otherwise lost during 1985.

January

1 January

6 January

14 January

17 January

21 January

Unknown date

February

5 February

7 February

8 February

10 February

14 February

15 February

26 February

March

3 March

6 March

21 March

26 March

29 March

30 March

April

7 April

11 April

18 April

23 April

27 April

29 April

May

9 May

10 May

13 May

16 May

20 May

22 May

28 May

June

2 June

3 June

4 June

15 June

16 June

27 June

July

3 July

10 July

12 July

13 July

21 July

23 July

24 July

26 July

29 July

August

3 August

7 August

10 August

18 August

19 August

21 August

25 August

September

6 September

13 September

21 September

25 September

29 September

October

16 October

20 October

26 October

28 October

30 October

Unknown date

November

11 November

17 November

18 November

26 November

December

6 December

16 December

18 December

19 December

Unknown date

References

See also 

1985
 
Ship